James "Jimmy" Pyke (8 February 1866 – 17 May 1941) was an English rugby union footballer who played in the 1890s. He played at representative level for England, and at club level for St. Helens Recs, as a forward, e.g. front row, lock, or back row. Prior to Saturday 6 September 1913, St. Helens Recs was a rugby union, and association football (soccer) club.

Background
Jimmy Pyke was born in St. Helens, Lancashire on 8 February 1866, and he died aged 75 in St. Helens, Lancashire on 17 May 1941.

Playing career

International honours
Jimmy Pyke won a cap for England while at St. Helens Recs in the 17-0 victory over Wales at Rectory Field, Blackheath on Saturday 2 January 1892.

Genealogical information
Jimmy Pyke's marriage to Martha (née Eden) was registered during July–September 1888 in Prescot district.

References

1866 births
1941 deaths
England international rugby union players
English rugby union players
Rugby union forwards
Rugby union players from St Helens, Merseyside
St Helens Recreation RLFC players